USS Nimble (AM-266) was an  built for the U.S. Navy during World War II. She was built to clear minefields in offshore waters, and served the Navy in the Atlantic Ocean and then was transferred to the Pacific Ocean.  Post-war, she returned home with three battle stars.

Nimble was laid down 2 August 1943 by the American Ship Building Company, Lorain, Ohio; launched 24 December 1943; and commissioned 15 September 1944.

World War II Atlantic operations
Nimble departed Cleveland, Ohio, 21 September 1944 and proceeded via the St. Lawrence River to the Atlantic and down the coast to Little Creek, Virginia, for shakedown exercises in Chesapeake Bay. From there she steamed south to Key West, Florida, for ASW training and on 20 December reported to the Naval Training Center Miami, Florida, for duty as a school ship. Detached 10 March 1945 she headed north to Philadelphia, Pennsylvania, underwent repairs and alterations and, on 1 April, got underway for the Panama Canal Zone.

Transfer to the Pacific Fleet 
She transited the Canal 11 April and, after stops at San Diego, California, Pearl Harbor, Eniwetok, and Guam, arrived in Nakagusuku Wan, Okinawa, 28 June.

On the 29th Nimble shifted to Kerama Retto whence she commenced sweeping the East China Sea as part of Operation Juneau. In mid-August, following the end of the war, Operation Skagway continued her mine clearance efforts in the East China Sea and Ryūkyūs area. At the end of the month, "Arcadia" took her to the Yellow Sea and from 2–7 September she cleared the approaches to Jinsen harbor for the entry of the 7th Amphibious Force into Korea for initial occupation duty. On the 9th she returned to waters off Kyūshū to sweep the Sasebo-Nagasaki area.

The minesweeper remained in the Far East opening sea-lanes to merchant and military shipping until September 1946.

Post-War decommissioning  
On the 15th she reported to Commander, Philippine Sea Frontier for inactivation. Decommissioning at Subic Bay 10 October, she remained in the Philippines until transferred to the Republic of China 30 June 1948. Struck from the U.S. Navy List 13 July 1948, she served the Navy of the Republic of China until stripped and decommissioned late in 1950.

References

External links 

Admirable-class minesweepers
Ships built in Lorain, Ohio
1943 ships
World War II minesweepers of the United States
Admirable-class minesweepers of the Republic of China Navy